Thomas Houkyn or Howkyn (died 1407, of Oxford), was an English Member of Parliament and county coroner.

He was a Member (MP) of the Parliament of England for Oxford in 1386.

References

14th-century births
1407 deaths
14th-century English people
People from Oxford
Members of the Parliament of England (pre-1707)